Metron is a fictional antihero appearing in American comic books published by DC Comics.

Publication history
Metron first appeared in New Gods #1 (February–March 1971) and was created by Jack Kirby for his Fourth World series. He was based on Leonard Nimoy's portrayal of the Star Trek character Spock and designed as a character who "would frequently change sides (between New Genesis and Apokolips)". The Metrons in Star Trek serve a similar capacity in the episode "Arena", seeking to settle a conflict in their star system by pitting Kirk against the captain of a Gorn ship who attacked a nearby outpost. The single Metron seen on screen vaguely resembles a young male in a silver toga, another visual connection to the "gods of old" and completely disinterested in taking sides.

Fictional character biography
Although he possesses the powers of a god, Metron is typically depicted as a passive observer in the DC Universe rather than an active participant. He wanders in search of greater knowledge beyond his own, riding on his Mobius Chair, which can traverse time and space instantaneously. Metron is of neither New Genesis nor Apokolips, and usually avoids the struggle between the two worlds almost entirely. As he states in New Gods #7, "The Pact": "I have no link with the Old Gods -- or New!! I am something different! Something that was unforeseen!! -- On New Genesis -- or here!!"

Metron invented the "Boom Tube" technology used by the New Gods to teleport vast distances.

In 1989's Legend mini-series, Metron confides in Darkseid about the Anti-Life Equation. Apparently, Metron holds the key to the Anti-Life Equation. However, he is a seeker of knowledge, therefore he will tell no one of his knowledge. In the 1982 DC/Marvel crossover, The Uncanny X-Men and The New Teen Titans, Metron tells Darkseid that Dark Phoenix is a part of the Anti-Life Equation. In the 2007 "Death of the New Gods" miniseries leading into Final Crisis, the Source explains the origin of the Anti-Life Equation to Metron.

Metron helped contact most of Earth's superheroes to gather them during the Zero Hour crisis. During Extant's return, he fought alongside the Justice Society of America in defeating Extant after he gained control of the omnipotent Worlogog.

In Kurt Busiek's JLA/Avengers miniseries, Metron observes the events in that story, and gives Iron Man a Mother Box to balance the power given to the Justice League by Grandmaster. His main role during the miniseries is to observe and investigate Krona's actions, refusing to deviate from his non-involvement at the end when Krona demanded his aid. At the end, Metron kept guard over the newly formed Cosmic egg.

In the 2005 Mister Miracle miniseries, Metron contacts Shilo Norman (the current Mister Miracle) during a stunt gone wrong, making him aware of the Fourth World. In his first appearance in the book, he looks like he has before, but later he disguises himself as an epileptic man in a wheelchair.

During the events of Death of the New Gods, where the mysterious deaths of the entire Fourth World accelerated, Metron tracked and discovered the mastermind: the Source itself, which has in truth been lurking in the backgrounds for millennia trying to reacquire its original powers and reunite with its other half: the Anti-Life Entity. In true form, Metron sought not to stop the Source, but rather to stand by the Source's side to watch and learn as the Fourth World of the New Gods came to an end.

Eventually, after the death of Mister Miracle at the hands of the Source, Metron grows disgusted and demands his own death. The Source complies, and kills Metron before going to confront Darkseid.

On the first page of Final Crisis #1, an all-silver being appears to Anthro the First Boy and proclaims, "I am Metron". Later in the issue, Doctor Light and Mirror Master are sent by Libra to recover a device that resembles Metron's chair. Other characters come to believe that Metron gave the invention of fire to mankind through Anthro.

Later, the Mister Miracle version of the character restores Nix Uotan, the fallen Monitor, to his god-like status, solving a Rubik's Cube in 17 moves: one move less than the minimum supposedly required for a human being to crack the cubes, triggering the conclusion of the Final Crisis of Humanity.

The Mobius Chair is later harvested by Superman to gain the precious Element X needed to power up the Miracle Machine enough to restore the Multiverse and undo all damages brought by the dark god Darkseid; in the new universe, it is revealed that every other denizen of Apokolips and New Genesis, except for Darkseid, is fated to be reborn (including Metron).

Metron appears in a near-death hallucination experienced by Bruce Wayne after his return to the present, encouraging Wayne to resist Darkseid's offer to embrace anti-life by encouraging him to recognize the first truth of Batman: that, despite his claims to the contrary, he has never been alone.

In 2011, The New 52 rebooted the DC universe. Metron consults with Highfather about the various uses of the Lantern rings. About twenty members of the interstellar police force, the Green Lantern Corps confront Highfather and his military forces. They are trying to recover the power ring belonging to the sentient planet Mogo, who needs it to remain sentient and viable. Highfather leaves the matter to his subordinates, who slaughter most of the Lanterns, something Highfather later regretted.

Metron confronts the Anti-Monitor on Earth 3 in an attempt to divert a war between the Anti-Monitor and Darkseid. A conversation between Metron and the Anti-Monitor suggests that he once sat on the Mobius Chair himself prior to Metron. Metron says that while he is sitting on the Mobius Chair, the Anti-Monitor is unable to hurt him. On the other hand, he is not immune from the attacks of others, as Metron is struck from behind by Grail, Darkseid's Amazonian daughter, presumably leaving him for dead there in the Crime Syndicate's universe.

Despite this, Metron subsequently returns to confront the Justice League and warn them that they should evacuate Earth, as it is impossible to win against the Anti-Monitor and Darkseid. However, Diana uses the Lasso of Truth to make Metron admit that they can find the answers if they take the chair from him, prompting Diana to pull him off the chair and Batman to sit in it, giving him access to all of Metron's accumulated knowledge.

After the Anti-Monitor and Darkseid are destroyed in battle, Metron appears on the moon where he trains Owlman, who now controls the Mobius Chair after Batman separates from it, and warns him not to seek many answers. As Owlman demands to know the secrets of the universe, he and Metron are immediately vaporized in a flash of blue light by the mysterious entity, with only the Mobius Chair left intact and bloody. During the fight between the Justice League and Grail, Batman used Metron's Mobius Chair to learn the true identity of Joker. It told him that "there are three", which he later revealed to Hal Jordan.

During the "Dark Nights: Death Metal" storyline, an omniversal being called the Chronicler watches the battle between Perpetua and Darkest Knight. He then revives Metron who noted that they have similar motives in life, like wanting to observe and save the Multiverse. Metron then allowed Chronicler to look into his mind.

Powers and abilities
Like most of the New Gods, Metron is immune to all diseases, being virtually immortal. His advanced physiology provides superhuman strength and endurance in any physical activity. Metron has demonstrated numerous god-like abilities somewhat inconsistently throughout his history. Metron is a super genius who has explored the universe and gained a vast amount of knowledge. Although the New God Himon is his superior at devising scientific theories, Metron surpasses him as a creator of inventions based on scientific theories. Metron has also created incredible technological wonders that are too numerous to mention here.

Equipment
Metron travels in his flying Mobius Chair, which enables him to travel through time, outer space, and other dimensions. Its tractor beams are powerful enough to carry a planet along behind the chair and can create impenetrable energy walls.

Other versions
In the JLA storyline Rock of Ages, an insane, evil Metron from an alternate future, where he is in service to Darkseid, has taken over Earth and possibly the entire universe. He is defeated when Batman asserts that the sole gap in his knowledge is his ignorance of what it means to be human, prompting him to use his powers to renounce his godhood, allowing Batman to knock him out with a single punch.

In Grant Morrison's Seven Soldiers mega series, Metron is a homeless paraplegic man in a wheelchair, having been cast out of the Fourth World as a result of Darkseid winning the war between Apokolips and New Genesis. He is seen playing chess with the Black Racer, and his wheelchair is sometimes pushed by Orion. While this story takes place in regular continuity, the section where Metron and the other New Gods appear in this state is revealed to have been one in a series of possible worlds experienced by Shilo Norman, and not the actual present.

The miniseries Captain Carrot and the Final Ark features a satirical version of the New Gods, in which they are anthropomorphic canines called the New Dogs. Metron is known as Muttron, and the Mobius Chair is known as the Bark-o-lounger.

Metron causes Kal-El's rocket to divert from Earth to Apokolips in the Elseworld comic Superman: The Dark Side.

Metron appears briefly in the 1982 Marvel/DC crossover special The Uncanny X-Men and The New Teen Titans, wherein the two teams battle Darkseid, Deathstroke and a resurrected Dark Phoenix.

In other media

Television
 Metron made a non-speaking cameo appearance in Superman: The Animated Series. In the episode "Apokolips... Now!", he is shown in the background when Orion brings New Genesis' troops to fend off Darkseid.
 Metron appears in Justice League Unlimited, voiced by Daniel Dae Kim. In the final two episodes "Alive!" and "Destroyer", he tries to warn Lex Luthor not to go through with Brainiac's resurrection, claiming what Lex will do will affect the universe. When Luthor ignores Metron and goes ahead, Darkseid ends up resurrected with Brainiac-enhanced technology. During Darkseid's attack on Earth, Lex Luthor notices Metron watching as Metron did warn him about what his actions would do. Metron later provides Lex with the means to defeat Darkseid by taking Luthor to the Source Wall to obtain the Anti-Life Equation.
 Metron appears in Young Justice, voiced by Phil LaMarr. In the episode "Quiet Conversations", Superboy, Black Lightning, and Forager seek out Metron to use his Mobius Chair to save Victor Stone from being consumed by a Father Box. Metron only accompanies them only to observe Victor die, resulting in Superboy forcibly removing him from the chair and Black Lightning incapacitating him so Victor could be plugged into the chair. Afterwards before Metron departs, he cryptically confirms to Black Lightning that Gretchen Goode is a New God. He returns in the season 4 episode "Encounter Upon the Razor's Edge!", assisting Razer by holding onto his Red Lantern ring as he continued his search for Aya. Metron then intercepts the attempt of Lor-Zod, Ma'alefa'ak, and Mantis to steal the Phantom Zone projector from his vault, and raises the alarm of this incident to the delegates of the summit between the New Gods, Justice League, and Green Lantern Corps.

Film
 In Justice League: Gods and Monsters, the crippled and apparently paralyzed Lex Luthor (voiced by Jason Isaacs) turns into a version of Metron via Boom Tube technology provided by Wonder Woman.
 Metron's Mobius chair appears in Justice League Dark: Apokolips War in which Batman sits on after Darkseid had taken control of Earth.

Toys
 Metron has received his own action figure through Mattel's online DC Universe Signature Series line, via MattyCollector.Com. This was a special edition figure only available to those who subscribed to the Club Infinite Earths program. Metron came complete with his Mobius Chair, in a distinctly larger package than standard DC Signature Series offerings.

References

External links
 Character Profile
 Unofficial Metron Chronology

Characters created by Jack Kirby
Comics characters introduced in 1971
DC Comics aliens
DC Comics characters with superhuman strength
DC Comics deities
DC Comics male characters